Wexford County is a county in the Northern Lower Peninsula of the U.S. state of Michigan. As of the 2020 United States Census, the population was 33,673. The seat of Wexford County is Cadillac, which is also the county's largest city.

Wexford County is largely covered by the Manistee National Forest, and thus is heavily wooded. The Manistee River flows from east to west in the north of the county.

The county is the location of the first known sighting of the Michigan Dogman, in 1887.

History

The county was established by the Michigan Legislature in 1840 as Kautawaubet County, after a Potawatomi phrase meaning "broken tooth," and the name of a local Potawatomi chief. In 1843, legislators renamed the county Wexford, after County Wexford in Ireland.

In 1851, Wexford County was attached to Grand Traverse County for administrative purposes. It was then attached to Manistee County in 1855, before being organized on its own in 1869.

County seat battle 
The Wexford County seat of government, originally located in Sherman, was moved to Manton in 1881, as the result of a compromise between the feuding residents of Cadillac and Sherman. Cadillac partisans, however, won the county seat by a county-wide vote in April 1882. The day following the election, a sheriff's posse left the city for Manton by special train to seize the county records. After they arrived and collected a portion of the materials, however, an angry crowd confronted the Cadillac men and drove them out of town.

When the sheriff returned to Cadillac, he encountered a force consisting of several hundred armed men; this group reportedly included a brass band. The Sheriff's force, some of whom may have been intoxicated, traveled back to Manton to seize the remaining records. Although Manton residents confronted the Cadillac men and barricaded the courthouse, the posse successfully seized the documents. They returned to Cadillac in dubious glory.

Geography
The Manistee River flows westward through the upper part of Wexford County. The county terrain consists of low rolling hills, largely tree-covered.

According to the US Census Bureau, the county has a total area of 575.46 sqmi (1,490 km2), of which 565.00 sqmi (1,463 km2) is land and 10.46 sqmi (27.1 km2) (1.8%) is water.

Major highways

 
  (Cadillac Route)
  (Manton Route)

Adjacent counties

 Grand Traverse County – north
 Kalkaska County – northeast
 Missaukee County – east
 Osceola County – southeast
 Lake County – southwest
 Manistee County – west
 Benzie County – northwest

Protected areas
 Brandy Brook Waterfowl Area
 Manistee National Forest (part)
 Mitchell State Park

Lakes

 Hodenpyl Dam Pond
 Lake Cadillac
 Lake Gitchegumee
 Lake Mitchell
 Long Lake
 Round Lake (part)

Demographics

2000 census
As of the 2000 United States Census, there were 30,484 people, 11,824 households, and 8,383 families in the county. The population density was 54/sqmi (20.8/km2). There were 14,872 housing units at an average density of 26.3/sqmi (10.2/km2). The racial makeup of the county was 97.29% White, 0.19% Black or African American, 0.74% Native American, 0.42% Asian, 0.03% Pacific Islander, 0.24% from other races, and 1.09% from two or more races. 1.01% of the population were Hispanic or Latino of any race. 21.4% were of German, 11.3% English, 9.5% American, 9.4% Irish, 6.1% Dutch, 5.8% Swedish and 5.3% Polish ancestry. 97.7% spoke English and 1.1% Spanish as their first language.

There were 11,824 households, out of which 33.60% had children under the age of 18 living with them, 56.20% were married couples living together, 10.30% had a female householder with no husband present, and 29.10% were non-families. 24.20% of all households were made up of individuals, and 10.10% had someone living alone who was 65 years of age or older.  The average household size was 2.55 and the average family size was 3.00.

The county population contained 26.80% under the age of 18, 7.70% from 18 to 24, 28.10% from 25 to 44, 23.40% from 45 to 64, and 14.00% who were 65 years of age or older. The median age was 37 years. For every 100 females, there were 98.10 males. For every 100 females age 18 and over, there were 93.80 males.

The median income for a household in the county was $35,363, and the median income for a family was $39,915. Males had a median income of $31,198 versus $21,733 for females. The per capita income for the county was $17,144.  About 7.70% of families and 10.30% of the population were below the poverty line, including 11.50% of those under age 18 and 8.50% of those age 65 or over.

Government
The county government operates the jail, maintains rural roads, operates the major local courts, keeps files of deeds and mortgages, maintains vital records, administers public health regulations, and participates with the state in the provision of welfare and other social services. The county board of commissioners controls the budget but has only limited authority to make laws or ordinances.  In Michigan, most local government functions — police and fire, building and zoning, tax assessment, street maintenance, etc. — are the responsibility of individual cities and townships.

Elected officials
 Prosecuting Attorney: Corey Wiggins
 Sheriff: Trent Taylor
 County Clerk: Alaina M. Nyman
 County Treasurer: Kristi Nottingham
 Register of Deeds: Lorie L. Sorensen
 Drain Commissioner: Michael J. Solomon
 County Surveyor: Craig J. Pullen

(information as of July 2019)

Politics
Wexford County is one of the few counties to have given majorities to both the first Republican candidate, John C. Frémont, and to John McCain in his 2008 presidential campaign. The county also twice favored Democrat Bill Clinton.

Wexford County is divided between Michigan's 1st and 2nd congressional districts, both represented by Republicans.

Tourism
There are many attractions and hot spots in Wexford County. The Manistee National Forest is one recreation site. The Manistee River is used by fishermen, kayakers, and canoers. There are many lakes; the largest are Cadillac and Mitchell. Two hundred miles of snowmobile trails are maintained by the Cadillac Winter Promotions volunteer group. There are at least eight golf courses near Cadillac. There are several museums near Cadillac. The Wexford Civic Center is a 4,000 capacity arena, 300 capacity hockey facility, 300 capacity grand stand, and several buildings for agricultural shows and expos.

Communities

Cities
 Cadillac (county seat)
 Manton

Villages
 Buckley
 Harrietta
 Mesick

Charter township
 Haring Charter Township

Civil townships

 Antioch Township
 Boon Township
 Cedar Creek Township
 Cherry Grove Township
 Clam Lake Township
 Colfax Township
 Greenwood Township
 Hanover Township
 Henderson Township
 Liberty Township
 Selma Township
 Slagle Township
 South Branch Township
 Springville Township
 Wexford Township

Census-designated places
 Boon
 Caberfae
 Haring
 Wedgewood

Other unincorporated communities

 Axin
 Bagnall
 Baxter
 Benson
 Garletts Corner
 Gilbert
 Glengary
 Harlan
 Hobart
 Hoxeyville
 Meauwataka
 Millersville
 Missaukee Junction
 Sherman
 Wexford Corner
 Yuma

Ghost towns

 Angola
 Bond's Mill
 Bunyea
 Cherry Grove
 Claggettville
 Coline
 Elton
 Haire
 Mystic
 Round Lake
 Soper
 Thorp
 Wexford

Historical markers

There are ten recognized Michigan historical markers in the county:
 Battle of Manton
 Caberfae Ski Resort
 Cadillac Carnegie Library
 Charles T. Mitchell House
 Clam Lake Canal
 Cobbs & Mitchell Building
 Cobbs and Mitchell Mill No.1
 First Wexford County Courthouse
 Greenwood Disciples of Christ Church
 Shay Locomotive

See also
 List of Michigan State Historic Sites in Wexford County, Michigan
 National Register of Historic Places listings in Wexford County, Michigan

References

External links
 Wexford County
 Wexford County Fact Book
 Chapter XVII Wexford County in A history of northern Michigan and its people by Perry F. Powers ; assisted by H.G. Cutler. Powers, Perry Francis, 1857–1945. Chicago: Lewis Publishing Co., 1912. p. 404
 History of Wexford County, Michigan, comp. by John H. Wheeler, Logansport, Ind.:B. F. Bowen, 1903.
 Wexford County Sheriff's Office

 
Michigan counties
1869 establishments in Michigan
Populated places established in 1869